Health Level Seven or HL7 refers to a set of international standards for transfer of clinical and administrative data between software applications used by various healthcare providers. These standards focus on the application layer, which is "layer 7" in the OSI model. The HL7 standards are produced by Health Level Seven International, an international standards organization, and are adopted by other standards issuing bodies such as American National Standards Institute and International Organization for Standardization.

Hospitals and other healthcare provider organizations typically have many different computer systems used for everything from billing records to patient tracking.  All of these systems should communicate with each other (or "interface") when they receive new information, or when they wish to retrieve information, but not all do so.

HL7 International specifies a number of flexible standards, guidelines, and methodologies by which various healthcare systems can communicate with each other. Such guidelines or data standards are a set of rules that allow information to be shared and processed in a uniform and consistent manner. These data standards are meant to allow healthcare organizations to easily share clinical information. Theoretically, this ability to exchange information should help to minimize the tendency for medical care to be geographically isolated and highly variable.

HL7 International considers the following standards to be its primary standards – those standards that are most commonly used and implemented:
 Version 2.x Messaging Standard – an interoperability specification for health and medical transactions
 Version 3 Messaging Standard – an interoperability specification for health and medical transactions
 Clinical Document Architecture (CDA) – an exchange model for clinical documents, based on HL7 Version 3
 Continuity of Care Document (CCD) – a US specification for the exchange of medical summaries, based on CDA.
 Structured Product Labeling (SPL) – the published information that accompanies a medicine, based on HL7 Version 3
 Clinical Context Object Workgroup (CCOW) – an interoperability specification for the visual integration of user applications

Other HL7 standards/methodologies include:
 Fast Healthcare Interoperability Resources (FHIR) – a standard for the exchange of resources  
 Arden Syntax – a grammar for representing medical conditions and recommendations as a Medical Logic Module (MLM)
 Claims Attachments – a Standard Healthcare Attachment to augment another healthcare transaction
 Functional Specification of Electronic Health Record (EHR) / Personal Health Record (PHR) systems – a standardized description of health and medical functions sought for or available in such software applications
 GELLO – a standard expression language used for clinical decision support

Primary standards
HL7's primary standards are those standards that Health Level Seven International considers to be most commonly used and implemented.

Version 2 messaging
The HL7 version 2 standard (also known as Pipehat) has the aim to support hospital workflows. It was originally created in 1989.

HL7 version 2 defines a series of electronic messages to support administrative, logistical, financial as well as clinical processes. Since 1987 the standard has been updated regularly, resulting in versions 2.1, 2.2, 2.3, 2.3.1, 2.4, 2.5, 2.5.1, 2.6, 2.7, 2.7.1, 2.8, 2.8.1 and 2.8.2. The v2.x standards are backward compatible (e.g., a message based on version 2.3 will be understood by an application that supports version 2.6).

HL7 v2.x messages use a non-XML encoding syntax based on segments (lines) and one-character delimiters. Segments have composites (fields) separated by the composite delimiter. A composite can have sub-composites (components) separated by the sub-composite delimiter, and sub-composites can have sub-sub-composites (subcomponents) separated by the sub-sub-composite delimiter. The default delimiters are carriage return for the segment separator, vertical bar or pipe (|) for the field separator, caret (^) for the component separator, ampersand (&) for the subcomponent separator, and number sign (#) for the default truncation separator. The tilde (~) is the default repetition separator. Each segment starts with a 3-character string that identifies the segment type. Each segment of the message contains one specific category of information. Every message has MSH as its first segment, which includes a field that identifies the message type. The message type determines the expected segment types in the message. The segment types used in a particular message type are specified by the segment grammar notation used in the HL7 standards.

The following is an example of an admission message.  MSH is the header segment, PID the Patient Identity, PV1 is the Patient Visit information, etc. The 5th field in the PID segment is the patient's name, in the order, family name, given name, second name (or their initials), suffix, etc. Depending on the HL7 V2.x standard version, more fields are available in the segment for additional patient information.

HL7 v2.x has allowed for the interoperability between electronic Patient Administration Systems (PAS), Electronic Practice Management (EPM) systems, Laboratory Information Systems (LIS), Dietary, Pharmacy and Billing systems as well as Electronic Medical Record (EMR) or Electronic Health Record (EHR) systems.  Currently, the HL7 v2.x messaging standard is supported by every major medical information systems vendor in the United States.

Version 3 messaging
The HL7 version 3 standard has the aim to support all healthcare workflows. Development of version 3 started around 1995, resulting in an initial standard publication in 2005. The v3 standard, as opposed to version 2, is based on a formal methodology (the HDF) and object-oriented principles.

RIM - ISO/HL7 21731

The Reference Information Model (RIM) is the cornerstone of the HL7 Version 3 development process and an essential part of the HL7 V3 development methodology. RIM expresses the data content needed in a specific clinical or administrative context and provides an explicit representation of the semantic and lexical connections that exist between the information carried in the fields of HL7 messages.

HL7 Development Framework - ISO/HL7 27931

The HL7 Version 3 Development Framework (HDF) is a continuously evolving process that seeks to develop specifications that facilitate interoperability between healthcare systems.  The HL7 RIM, vocabulary specifications, and model-driven process of analysis and design combine to make HL7 Version 3 one methodology for development of consensus-based standards for healthcare information system interoperability.  The HDF is the most current edition of the HL7 V3 development methodology.

The HDF not only documents messaging, but also the processes, tools, actors, rules, and artifacts relevant to development of all HL7 standard specifications. Eventually, the HDF will encompass all of the HL7 standard specifications, including any new standards resulting from analysis of electronic health record architectures and requirements.

HL7 specifications draw upon codes and vocabularies from a variety of sources.  The V3 vocabulary work ensures that the systems implementing HL7 specifications have an unambiguous understanding of the code sources and code value domains they are using.

V3 Messaging

The HL7 version 3 messaging standard defines a series of Secure Text messages (called interactions) to support all healthcare workflows.

HL7 v3 messages are based on an XML encoding syntax, as shown in this example:

<POLB_IN224200 ITSVersion="XML_1.0" xmlns="urn:hl7-org:v3"
 xmlns:xsi="http://www.w3.org/2001/XMLSchema-instance">  
  <id root="2.16.840.1.113883.19.1122.7" extension="CNTRL-3456"/>
  <creationTime value="200202150930-0400"/>
  <!-- The version of the datatypes/RIM/vocabulary used is that of May 2006 -->
  <versionCode code="2006-05"/>
  <!-- interaction id= Observation Event Complete, w/o Receiver Responsibilities -->
  <interactionId root="2.16.840.1.113883.1.6" extension="POLB_IN224200"/>
  <processingCode code="P"/>
  <processingModeCode nullFlavor="OTH"/>
  <acceptAckCode code="ER"/>
  <receiver typeCode="RCV">
    <device classCode="DEV" determinerCode="INSTANCE">
      <id extension="GHH LAB" root="2.16.840.1.113883.19.1122.1"/>
      <asLocatedEntity classCode="LOCE">
        <location classCode="PLC" determinerCode="INSTANCE">
          <id root="2.16.840.1.113883.19.1122.2" extension="ELAB-3"/>
        </location>
      </asLocatedEntity>
    </device>
  </receiver>
  <sender typeCode="SND">
    <device classCode="DEV" determinerCode="INSTANCE">
      <id root="2.16.840.1.113883.19.1122.1" extension="GHH OE"/>
      <asLocatedEntity classCode="LOCE">
        <location classCode="PLC" determinerCode="INSTANCE">
          <id root="2.16.840.1.113883.19.1122.2" extension="BLDG24"/>
        </location>
      </asLocatedEntity>
    </device>
  </sender>
  <!-- Trigger Event Control Act & Domain Content -->
</POLB_IN224200>

Clinical Document Architecture (CDA)

The HL7 Clinical Document Architecture (CDA) is an XML-based markup standard intended to specify the encoding, structure and semantics of clinical documents for exchange. The standard was jointly published with ISO as ISO/HL7 27932.

Continuity of Care Document (CCD)

CCD is a US specification for the exchange of medical summaries, based on CDA.

Structured Product Labeling (SPL)

SPL describes the published information that accompanies a medicine, based on HL7 Version 3.

CCOW

CCOW, or "Clinical Context Object Workgroup," is a standard protocol designed to enable disparate applications to share user context and patient context in real-time, and at the user-interface level.  CCOW implementations typically require a CCOW vault system to manage user security between applications.

Other standards and methods

Fast Healthcare Interoperability Resources (FHIR)

Fast Healthcare Interoperability Resources is a draft standard from HL7 International designed to be easier to implement, more open and more extensible than version 2.x or version 3.  It leverages a modern web-based suite of API technology, including a HTTP-based RESTful  protocol, HTML and Cascading Style Sheets for user interface integration, a choice of JSON or XML for data representation, OAuth for authorization and ATOM for query results.

Services Aware Interoperability Framework

The HL7 Services-Aware Enterprise Architecture Framework (SAIF) provides consistency between all HL7 artifacts, and enables a standardized approach to Enterprise Architecture (EA) development and implementation, and a way to measure the consistency.

SAIF is a way of thinking about producing specifications that explicitly describe the governance, conformance, compliance, and behavioral semantics that are needed to achieve computable semantic working interoperability. The intended information transmission technology might use a messaging, document exchange, or services approach.

SAIF is the framework that is required to rationalize interoperability of other standards. SAIF is an architecture for achieving interoperability, but it is not a whole-solution design for enterprise architecture management.

Arden syntax 

The Arden syntax is a language for encoding medical knowledge. HL7 International adopted and oversees the standard beginning with Arden syntax 2.0. These Medical Logic Modules (MLMs) are used in the clinical setting as they can contain sufficient knowledge to make single medical decisions.  They can produce alerts, diagnoses, and interpretations along with quality assurance function and administrative support.  An MLM must run on a computer that meets the minimum system requirements and has the correct program installed.  Then, the MLM can give advice for when and where it is needed.

MLLP
A large portion of HL7 messaging is transported by Minimal Lower Layer Protocol (MLLP), also known as Lower Layer Protocol (LLP) or Minimum Layer Protocol (MLP). For transmitting via TCP/IP, header and trailer characters are added to the message to identify the beginning and ending of the message because TCP/IP is a continuous stream of bytes. Hybrid Lower Layer Protocol (HLLP) is a variation of MLLP that includes a checksum to help verify message integrity. Amongst other software vendors, MLLP is supported by Microsoft, Oracle, Cleo.

MLLP contains no inherent security or encryption but relies on lower layer protocols such as Transport Layer Security (TLS) or IPsec for safeguarding Protected health information outside of a secure network.

Functional EHR and PHR specifications
Functional specifications for an electronic health record.

Message details

The OBR segment
An OBR Segment carries information about an exam, diagnostic study/observation. It is a required segment in an ORM (order message) or an ORU (Observation Result) message.

See also
 CDISC
 DICOM
 DVTk
 Electronic medical record
 eHealth
 EHRcom
 European Institute for Health Records (European Union)
 Fast Healthcare Interoperability Resources
 Health Informatics
 Health Informatics Service Architecture (HISA)
 Healthcare Services Specification Project (HSSP)
 Integrating the Healthcare Enterprise(IHE)
 ISO TC 215
 LOINC
 NextGen Connect
 openEHR Foundation
 Public Health Information Network
 SNOMED, SNOMED CT
 Nomenclature for Properties and Units terminology

References

External links
 HL7.org site
 What does HL7 education mean?
 HL7 International is a member of the Joint Initiative on SDO Global Health Informatics Standardization
 HL7 Tools Page
 Australian Healthcare Messaging Laboratory (AHML) - Online HL7 Message Testing and Certification
 Comprehensive Implementation of HL7 v3 Specifications in Java
 NIST HL7 Conformance Testing Framework
 ICH-HL7 Regulated Product Submissions
 HL7 Tutorial Directory
 HL7 Programming Tutorials, Short Tutorials on many HL7 concepts for Programmers.

Critical reviews
 HL7 RIM: An Incoherent Standard  
HL7 RIM Under Scrutiny (attempted rebuttal)(publication date?)
 HL7 WATCH
 Update 2013: Human Action in the Healthcare Domain: A Critical Analysis of HL7’s Reference Information Model
 

International standards
Agent-based software
American National Standards Institute standards
Standards for electronic health records
Data coding framework